Cnemaspis neangthyi, also known commonly as Neang Thy's rock gecko, is a species of lizard in the family Gekkonidae. The species is endemic to Cambodia.

Etymology
The specific name, neangthyi, is in honor of Cambodian herpetologist Neang Thy (born 1970).

Geographic range
C. neangthyi is found in the Cardamom Mountains in Pursat Province, Cambodia.

Description
Dorsally, it has a light-colored chevron between the shoulders. The tip of the tail is white with black specks.

References

Further reading
Grismer, Jesse L.; Grismer, L. Lee; Chav, Thou (2010). "New Species of Cnemaspis Strauch 1887 (Squamata: Gekkonidae) from Southwestern Cambodia". Journal of Herpetology 44 (1): 28–36. (Cnemaspis neangthyi, new species).
Grismer LL, Wood PL Jr, Anuar S, Riyanto A, Ahmad N, Muin MA, Sumontha M,  Grismer JL, Onn CK, Quah ESH, Pauwels OSG (2014). "Systematics and natural history of Southeast Asian Rock Geckos (genus Cnemaspis Strauch, 1887) with descriptions of eight new species from Malaysia, Thailand, and Indonesia". Zootaxa 3880 (1): 001–147.

Cnemaspis
Reptiles described in 2010